Mung bean jelly may refer to:

Liangfen, Chinese jelly made of mung bean starch
Nokdumuk, Korean jelly made of mung bean starch
 Cheongpomuk, white mung bean jelly
 Hwangpomuk, yellow mung bean jelly